The discography of American reggae musician and rapper Matisyahu consists of five studio albums, four live albums, one compilation album, two remix albums, three extended plays and twenty singles.

Albums

Studio albums

2022-03-25

Live albums

Compilation albums

Remix albums

Extended plays

Singles

As lead artist

As featured artist

Other charted songs

Notes

References

External links
 
 
 

Reggae discographies
Discographies of American artists